The 1996 PBA All-Filipino Cup Finals was the best-of-7 series basketball championship of the 1996 PBA All-Filipino Cup, and the conclusion of the conference's playoffs. The Alaska Milkmen and Purefoods TJ Hotdogs played for the 63rd championship contested by the league.

The Alaska Milkmen won against Purefoods TJ Hotdogs, 4 games to 1, for their first ever back-to-back championships as they became the 9th team to win the All-Filipino crown.

Qualification

Series scoring summary

Games summary

Game 1

The Milkmen were apparently in control of the ballgame after having a comfortable 69–51 lead in the third quarter by having a 7–0 run. In the fourth quarter, Alaska then became scoreless for three minutes after Jun Reyes' field goal, allowing Purefoods to put together an 11–0 scoring run, reducing the lead by one point with 46.7 seconds remaining after Poch Juinio was called on illegal defense.

Purefoods also kept possession after Alvin Patrimonio's free throw but he missed a jumper that could have given his team the lead. All hope wasn't lost for Purefoods as Jojo Lastimosa split his charities from Jerry Codinera's foul with 16 seconds remaining. Rey Evangelista rebounded another Patrimonio miss and was fouled by Hawkins with 2.9 seconds left. Evangelista also split his charities allowing Alaska to escape with a one-point lead, 78–77.

Glenn Capacio of Purefoods will be suspended for Game 2 and will be fined P5000 for slapping Alaska forward Bong Hawkins during the third quarter. Capacio slapped Hawkins after he was hit in the face by Hawkins' shoulder in trying to set a pick for Jeffrey Cariaso.

Game 2

Jojo Lastimosa led a 17–7 burst midway through the third period, during which he hit two jumpers, a pair of free throws and a three-pointer to give Alaska its biggest lead, 59–44. Purefoods, behind Alvin Patrimonio and Olsen Racela, answered back to come to within 68–63 with nine minutes remaining, the hotdogs were then held scoreless in the next six minutes and the milkmen took advantage on an 8–0 burst to erect a 76–63 lead with still 3:26 to go.

Game 3

Purefoods opened the game with a 19–6 run and never looked back, posting leads of as many as 23 points. The Hotdogs took a 52–35 lead at the half and a 20–7 blast after Alaska drew to within 58–48 gave the Hotdogs their biggest lead, 78–55, with two minutes left in the third quarter.

Game 4

The Hotdogs forced the Milkmen to seven turnovers in the second quarter, enabling them to trimmed down the 23–12 Alaska lead at the end of the first period to just 37–32 at halftime. Bong Hawkins, Johnny Abarrientos and Jojo Lastimosa presided over a 9–2 run midway through the third quarter to pad the Milkmen's lead back to 12 points at 62–50.

Game 5

Jeffrey Cariaso sank two decisive free throws with six-tenths of a second remaining in overtime to squeeze out a one-point victory for Alaska and win their first All-Filipino title. Cariaso was fouled by Bong Ravena, who tried to intercept Jun Reyes' inbound but instead tagged Cariaso's arm and drew a foul, Ravena had earlier scored on a layup to give the Hotdogs a 91–89 lead and blocked Jojo Lastimosa to set up Alvin Patrimonio's free throw off Bong Hawkins that pushed Purefoods up, 92–91 with only 10.3 seconds to go.

Rosters

Broadcast notes

References

External links
PBA official website

1996 PBA season
1996
Alaska Aces (PBA) games
Magnolia Hotshots games
PBA All-Filipino Cup Finals